12th & Delaware is a documentary film set in a crisis pregnancy center (named Pregnancy Care Center) and an abortion clinic (named A Woman's World Medical Center) across the street from it in Fort Pierce, Florida. The film was produced and filmed by Rachel Grady and Heidi Ewing and covers the center and its patients over the period of a year. The film shows interviews of staff at both facilities, as well as pregnant women who are going to them.  12th & Delaware premiered on January 24, 2010, at the 2010 Sundance Film Festival in the U.S. Documentary Competition. It won a Peabody Award that same year "for its poignant portrait of women facing exceedingly difficult decisions at a literal intersection of opposing ideologies."

One of the interviewees was president of the Pregnancy Care Centre, Father Thomas J. Euteneuer. In January 2011, Euteneuer issued a statement disclosing that he had "violat[ed] the boundaries of chastity with an adult female ... I take full responsibility for my own poor judgment, my weakness and my sinful conduct that resulted from it". and then in June 2012, it was reported that a woman had filed a lawsuit accusing Euteneuer of sexual abuse during what were supposed to be exorcisms.

References

External links
 
 , posted by Loki Films
 

2010 documentary films
2010 films
American documentary films
Crisis pregnancy centers
Documentary films about abortion
Fort Pierce, Florida
HBO documentary films
Films directed by Heidi Ewing and Rachel Grady
Films set in Florida
Documentary films about Florida
Women in Florida
2010s English-language films
2010s American films